Nikaia (Níkaia), known before 1940 as Kokkinia (Kokkiniá), is a suburb of Piraeus, in the southwestern part of the Athens Urban Area, Greece. Since the 2011 local government reform it is part of the municipality Nikaia-Agios Ioannis Rentis in the regional unit of Piraeus, and it is the seat and a municipal unit of the municipality.

Geography

The municipal unit has an area of 6.649 km2. The main streets are Gregori Lambraki Street and Petrou Ralli Street.

Transport
Nikaia metro station of line 3 situated on the city. Also served by buses (OSY).

History
On August 17, 1944, took place the Executions of Kokkinia. It was the largest Nazi roundup and one of the largest-scale war crimes perpetrated during the German occupation of Greece.

Nikaia, like many other places around Greece, owes its population eruption to Greek refugees who left the Asia Minor coast after the 1922 war ended. It was part of the municipality of Piraeus until 1933, when it became a separate municipality, then still under the name Nea Kokkinia. It was renamed to Nikaia in 1940.

The 8th International Tournament of Nikaia, a chess tournament, took place between August 19 and 27, 2000. The Greek Weightlifting Grand Prix took place in Nikaia on December 9 and 10, 2003.

Sports
Nikaia has four sport clubs with important history. These are Proodeftiki with a great successful history in the football, Ionikos Nikaias with successful departments in the football (Ionikos Nikaias F.C.) and basketball (Ionikos Nikaias B.C.), A.E. Nikaias and Aris Nikaias.

Sites of interest

 Klimakia Gallery
 Nikaia Olympic Weightlifting Hall, a hall which was used for weightlifting in the 2004 Summer Olympics.  Website
 Platon National Sports Centre
 Nikaia Municipal Gymnasium for Proodeftiki
 Neapoli Stadium for Ionikos FC
 Katrakeio Theater, an open-air theater dedicated to Manos Katrakis

Historical population

References

External links
Official website 
hellas2000/nikea2000/nikea2000.html 8th International Chess Tournament

Populated places in Piraeus (regional unit)
Nikaia-Agios Ioannis Rentis